Safebreakers is a technological game show presented by Ben Shephard. It was broadcast on Sky1 from 15 August to 3 October 2011.

Format
In a similar vein to Scrapheap Challenge, over two days, and with a limited budget and materials, two teams attempt to build a vehicle which will help them travel to a safe in a seemingly inaccessible location. On the third day, the teams race their vehicles towards the safe. The teams pick up the safe's combination, with the first team to arrive entering the combination, and taking home the contents of the safe – £5,000 in cash.

External links

2011 British television series debuts
2011 British television series endings
Sky UK original programming
Television series by All3Media